Cymothoe zombana is a butterfly in the family Nymphalidae. It is found on the Zomba and Nyika plateaus in Malawi.

References

Butterflies described in 1926
Cymothoe (butterfly)
Endemic fauna of Malawi
Butterflies of Africa